Helosciadium bermejoi, synonym Apium bermejoi, is a critically endangered species of flowering plant in the family Apiaceae.

Taxonomy
It is not closely related to the wild form of celery, A. graveolens, being more properly placed in the genus Helosciadium in the tribe Oenantheae.

Distribution
H. bermejoi is endemic to Menorca in the Balearic Islands of Spain, and the total population is now restricted to a single locality in the northeast part of the island. Across the two populations at this spot, there are fewer than a hundred individuals surviving.

Ecology
Its natural habitat is Mediterranean-type shrubby vegetation, known as matorral.

Conservation
It was classified as 'critically endangered' in the IUCN Red List in 2006. In the European Union it has been designated as a 'priority species' under Annex II of the Habitats Directive since 1992, which means areas in which it occurs can be declared Special Areas of Conservation, if these areas belong to one of the number of habitats listed in Annex I of the directive.

References

Apioideae
Flora of Spain
Critically endangered plants
Taxonomy articles created by Polbot